The 1939–40 Campionat de Catalunya season was the 40th and last since its establishment and was played between 24 September and 19 November 1939.

Overview before the season
Six teams joined the Division One league, including two that would play the 1939–40 La Liga and four from the 1939–40 Segunda División.

From La Liga
Barcelona
Espanyol

From Segunda División

Badalona
Girona
Granollers
Sabadell

Division One

League table

Results

Top goalscorers

Division Two

League table

Copa Catalunya seasons
1939–40 in Spanish football